Fariba Ahmadi Kakar was elected to represent Kandahar Province in Afghanistan's Wolesi Jirga, the lower house of its National Legislature, in 2005.
Born in 1965 in Kandahar, a report on Kandahar prepared at the Navy Postgraduate School stated she was a "self-educated teacher" and a member of the Pashtun ethnic group.  She sits on the Communications Committee.
In August 2013, while travelling with her children in Gazni, Afghanistan, she was kidnapped by the Taliban who demanded the release of four Taliban prisoners in exchange for the release of Mrs Kakar. 
On 8 September 2013, she was freed in return for the release of several family members of Taliban fighters held in captivity.

References 

Politicians of Kandahar Province
Members of the House of the People (Afghanistan)
21st-century Afghan women politicians
21st-century Afghan politicians
Kidnapped Afghan people
People from Kandahar Province
Living people
1965 births
Pashtun women